Lucia Migliaccio, Duchessa di Floridia (19 July 1770 – 26 April 1826) was the second wife of Ferdinand I of the Two Sicilies. Their marriage was morganatic and Lucia was never a queen consort. She was the daughter of Don Vincenzo Migliaccio and Donna Dorotea Borgia dei Marchesi del Casale.

On 4 April 1791, Lucia married Don Benedetto Maria III Grifeo, 8º Principe di Partanna. They had seven children together. However, Benedetto died in 1812. Two years later, on 27 November 1814, Lucia married the King of the Two Sicilies, Ferdinand I. The two had met frequently at the royal court. They had no children together, and Ferdinand died in 1825. Their marriage caused a scandal at court, and Ferdinand’s eldest son from his first marriage with Archduchess Maria Carolina of Austria, Francis, tried to persuade his father not to marry Lucia.

Family
Lucia was a daughter of Don Vincenzo Migliaccio, 8th Duke of Floridia, and his wife, Donna Dorotea Borgia dei Marchesi del Casale, and inherited her father's dukedom. Her mother came from Syracuse, Sicily. Lucia Migliaccio had several sons and a daughter, Lucia Borbone, who married Salvatore Sagnelli. Both of them are buried in Maddaloni, near Caserta.

Marriages
She married first Don Benedetto Maria III Grifeo, 8th Prince di Partanna. They had five children:

 Don Giuseppe Grifeo
 Donna Marianna Grifeo
 Don Vincenzo Grifeo
 Don Leopoldo Grifeo
 Don Luigi Grifeo

On 27 November 1814, Lucia married Ferdinand I of the Two Sicilies, also known as Ferdinand III of Sicily, in Palermo. The bride was forty-four years old and the groom sixty-three. Their marriage created a scandal as it took place less than three months from 8 September 1814, the death of his first wife Queen Maria Carolina of Austria. Protocol rules required at least one-year period of mourning. By then, Ferdinand had already practically abdicated his power by naming his eldest son Prince Francis as his regent and delegating most decisions to him. His deceased queen, Maria Carolina, herself had been considered the de facto ruler of Sicily until 1812. Lucia after her marriage had very limited influence and little interest in politics.

Ferdinand was restored to the throne of the Kingdom of Naples by right of his victory on the Battle of Tolentino (3 May 1815) over Joachim Murat. On 8 December 1816 he merged the thrones of Sicily and Naples under the name of the throne of the Two Sicilies, with Francis still serving as his regent and Lucia as his morganatic spouse.

Ferdinand continued to rule until his death on 4 January 1825. Lucia survived him by a year and three months.  She was buried in the Church of San Ferdinando, Naples.

Notes

External links

 Lucia Migliaccio, Duchess of Floridia, morganatic 2nd wife of Ferdinando I, King of the Two Sicilies at Unofficial Royalty

1770 births
1826 deaths
People from Syracuse, Sicily
Lucia
Morganatic spouses
Italian Roman Catholics
18th-century Italian women
19th-century Italian women
18th-century Roman Catholics
19th-century Roman Catholics